Bleona Qereti (born 14 May 1985), also known mononymously as Bleona, is an Albanian-American singer, songwriter, actress, entrepreneur, model and television personality.

Qereti is an American Citizen, and as of 2010, Bleona lives in California, where she has worked with producers such as Timbaland, Rodney Jerkins, and Grammy award winner David Foster.  She has 8 Albums in Albania and has released several singles in English, such as "Show Off", "Famous", "Take You Over", "Without You" and "Pass Out," the latter co-produced by Timbaland. September 10, 2013, she released the single "Take It Like A Man" which shot to No. 7 in the UK charts entirely on the strength of its fierce attitude and club-ready beat with no promotional without any support from a music label. She was also a celebrity judge on the fourth season of the Albanian version of The X Factor and the breakout star of the 2014 Bravo's TV reality series Euros of Hollywood, winning over viewers with her offbeat humor and outrageous personality.
In February 2019, she landed her first number one on Billboard's Dance Club Songs chart with "I Don't Need Your Love."

Life and career 
Bleona began singing at age 5 when she joined the House of Pionieri and performed her first solo concert at age 9 for the Albanian Secret Service, where her father worked. At 13, her parents encouraged her to focus on academics and give up on singing, but against their advice, she continued to pursue a career in entertainment. When she was 14 years old, Bleona earned an audition and landed her first major role as the lead singer for the Skampa Theater in Elbasan. 

Following a performance at the Albanian National Music Festival at age 15, Bleona became a household name in her native country. She released her first single, "Lermeni (Let Me Be Free)" and a year later released her first album, Kam Qejfin Tim (I Run My Own Game). Bleona's first major tour took place that year, and she performed 25 summer shows at concert halls in Switzerland and Germany. 
Bleona speaks and sings in English, Albanian, Italian and German. 
She studied the Stanislavski System of acting, graduating with a BA from the Academy of Performing Arts in Tirana. She also plays violin.

1998–2008 

From 1998 through 2002, Bleona released four albums, all of which reached the charts in southeastern Europe. 
In 1999 she headlined the Humanitarian Tour for the People of Kosovo, where she played a number of concerts around Europe. 
From 2000 to 2001 she performed more than 80 concerts across Europe, and by 2002 was headlining outdoor concerts and festivals. 
In that same year she released the DVD Nje xhiro neper Shqiperi (Walking Through Albania).
In 2003 Bleona released the album Ti Nuk Di As Me Ma Lyp. Within 3 months of its release, the album had sold 300,000 copies. Over the next four years she again toured throughout Kosovo, England, Germany, Switzerland, and Italy, and co-headlined with the rock group, Elita 5.

Bleona's first tour in the United States was in 2004, when a club promoter invited her to New York City to perform at the legendary Webster Hall. Since then, she has continued to perform in both the United States, the Middle East and in Europe.

Bleona’s 2005 album, Boom Boom was recorded in both English and Albanian. That same year her single "S'dua" won the Media Award at the "Magic Song Festival Awards," Albania's version of the Grammy Awards. In 2006, Bleona became the youngest recipient of Albania’s VMA "Excellent Career Award" in the award's history. Her eighth album Mandarin sold over 800,000 copies in 2007, breaking her previous record. In theme with the album, which means "tangerine," she dyed her hair red in 2006 and kept it that way until 2007, featuring the color in three music videos. In 2008, Bleona won two awards (media & internet) with the song "Magnetic" at the "Magic Song Festival Awards".

2009–2012 

Bleona moved to the U.S. in September 2010. Shortly afterward she met producer Timbaland while both were attending the Grammy Awards, and after a year of discussions, she began working with him on three new tracks. Her first English language single "Show Off" featuring Petey Pablo was released on September 27, 2010. Bleona has also worked on songs with Rodney Jerkins, Makeba, and Jimmy Douglass.

In February 2011, Bleona became a citizen of the United States.

In September 2012, Bleona's co-produced single with Timbaland, "Pass Out" featuring Brasco was released. She toured Europe to promote the single, performing in Albania in the cities of Vlora, Elbasan, Shkoder and Tirana; the capital city of Pristina in Kosovo; Tetovo in Macedonia and Düsseldorf, Germany. Supporting her on tour was DJ Freestyle Steve and Brasco. Concert attendance ranged from 50 to 70,000 people per performance.

2013–present 

In the summer 2013, Bleona announced the release of her single "Take It Like A Man" produced by StopWaitGo. Maximum Pop called it "an uplifting dance floor filler that screams 'GIRL POWER' at the top of its euro-pop lungs". She celebrated the track reaching #7 on the UK club charts by headlining Las Vegas Gay Pride on September 7, 2013.

Bleona was invited to perform consecutive years at the "White Party", joining Lady Gaga as just the second artist to perform two years in a row. As a result, her single "Fuck You I'm Famous" became an anthem for the LGBTQ community.

In 2015 following her time as a judge on X Factor Europe, Bleona's single "Take You Over" peaked at #3 on the Billboard Dance chart.

Bleona recorded her version of the 1980s Italian hit song "Su Di Noi" originally by Enzo Ghinazzi. Her music video for the track was shot at the iconic El Matador Beach in Malibu, California. In February 2019, she landed her first number-one single on Billboard's Dance Club Songs chart with the hit track "I Don't Need Your Love".

Other ventures

Television 

Bleona made her acting debut in 2012 with an appearance in an episode of Steven Seagal's True Justice. In 2017, she landed a role alongside Dolph Lundgren in Dead Trigger. The following year, Bleona appeared in 211, an action-thriller starring Nicolas Cage. Bleona was cast as Nova in the 2019 series Paper Empire in what would be her first major role alongside Wesley Snipes, Denise Richards, Robert Ravi and Anne Archer.

In February 2014, Bleona started shooting a new reality television series titled Euros of Hollywood which premiered on November 3, 2014, on Bravo network. The show followed Bleona recording her first album in English and her life in America on becoming a global superstar. In 2015, Bleona returned to Albania where she was a member of the X Factor jury. In 2016, she was a member of Your Face Sounds Familiar jury in Albania.

Personal life 

Qereti is multilingual and is fluent in Albanian, German, English and Italian. In 2009, she moved to the city of Los Angeles, United States, and became a naturalized American citizen in 2011.

Discography 

Kam Qejfin Tim (1997)
Nese Me Do Fort (1999) 
S'me Behet Vone (2001) 
Ik Meso Si Dashurohet (2002)
Ti Nuk Di As Me Ma Lyp (2003)
Greatest Hits (2005) 
Boom Boom (2005)   
Mandarin (2007)

References 

21st-century Albanian actresses
21st-century Albanian women singers
21st-century American actresses
21st-century American women singers
Albanian businesspeople
Albanian female models
Albanian-language singers
American songwriters
American female models
Albanian emigrants to the United States
Living people
People with acquired American citizenship
Albanian pop musicians
English-language singers from Albania
American people of Albanian descent